Mediodactylus oertzeni is a species of lizard in the family Gekkonidae. It is endemic to the Dodecanese Islands in Greece. It is sometimes considered a subspecies of Kotschy's gecko.

References

Mediodactylus
Reptiles described in 1888